Peter Muck (22 August 1919 – 10 April 2011) was a German violinist an violist.

Life 
Born in Leipzig, Muck, violinist and violist, was a member of the Berlin Philharmonic from 1949 to 1978. In 1968, he began collecting documents on the orchestral history of this Orchestra. In May 1982, on the occasion of the orchestra's one hundredth anniversary, he published the three-volume commemorative publication Einhundert Jahre Berliner Philharmonisches Orchestra. With his collection, he laid the foundation stone for the archive of the Berlin Philharmonic Orchestra.

Honours 
 Verdienstkreuz am Bande der Bundesrepublik Deutschland

Work 
 Einhundert Jahre Berliner Philharmonisches Orchester. 3 volumes. Hans Schneider, Tutzing 1982, .
 Karl Muck. Ein Dirigentenleben in Briefen und Dokumenten. Hans Schneider, Tutzing 2003, .

Further reading 
 Berliner Philharmoniker: Variationen mit Orchester – 125 Jahre Berliner Philharmoniker, vol. 2, Biografien und Konzerte, Verlag Henschel, May 2007, 
 Ich war unentwegt am Suchen und Finden. Peter Muck – Geiger, Bratscher und Chronist der Berliner Philharmoniker, In Berliner Philharmoniker – das magazin, Mai/Juni 2009

References

External links 
 

Recipients of the Cross of the Order of Merit of the Federal Republic of Germany
German classical violinists
Violists
1919 births
2011 deaths
Musicians from Leipzig